Mattias Karlsson (born April 15, 1985) is a Swedish professional ice hockey player, currently playing with Leksands IF in the Swedish Hockey League (SHL).

Playing career
Karlsson turned professional with Brynäs IF in the 2002–03 season and was drafted in the fourth round of the 2003 NHL Entry Draft by Ottawa Senators in NHL. He played for Brynäs through 2004–05, before moving to Almtuna IS in 2005–06, before settling down to one team Bofors IK for the 2006–07 season. Karlsson was tied for the team lead in scoring with 32 points (11 goals) in 2006-07 and added 34 penalty minutes in 44 games.

Karlsson signed with the Ottawa Senators in 2007 and played two games with the Senators' AHL team, the Binghamton Senators, before returning to Sweden to play with Färjestads BK on assignment from Ottawa on October 26, 2007.

In 2008, he attended the Ottawa Senators training camp and was assigned to the Binghamton Senators, where he played 73 games, leading the league among rookie defenseman in scoring with 51 points to be named in the All-Rookie Team. In 2009, he returned to Sweden and played for two seasons with Timrå IK before signing with HV71 in 2011.

After spending the 2015–16 season, abroad with Russian club, Severstal Cherepovets in the Kontinental Hockey League (KHL), Larsson returned to Sweden signing with Karlskrona HK.

Karlsson played two SHL seasons with Karlskrona before signing a two-year contract with then HockeyAllsvenskan club, Leskands IF, on 4 May 2018.

Awards and honours

Career statistics

Regular season and playoffs

International

References

External links
 

1985 births
Living people
Almtuna IS players
Binghamton Senators players
Bofors IK players
Brynäs IF players
Färjestad BK players
HV71 players
Karlskrona HK players
Leksands IF players
Ottawa Senators draft picks
Severstal Cherepovets players
Swedish ice hockey defencemen
Timrå IK players